Chaenogaleus affinis is an extinct species of weasel shark which existed during the Miocene epoch. It was described by Josef Probst in 1879.

References

Chaenogaleus
Miocene sharks
Neogene fish of Europe